Lapeyrouse is a commune in the Ain department in eastern France.

Geography
The village lies in the middle of the commune, which counts numerous ponds.

The Chalaronne has its source in the commune.

Population

See also
Communes of the Ain department
Dombes

References

External links

Dombes and the city of Lapeyrouse

Communes of Ain
Ain communes articles needing translation from French Wikipedia